Christian persecution may refer to:

 History of Christian thought on persecution and tolerance

Persecution of other groups by Christians
 Historical persecution by Christians
Persecution of Heathens (disambiguation)
 Persecution of pagans in the late Roman Empire
 Christian persecution of paganism under Theodosius I
Anti-paganism policy of Constantius II
 Persecution of Germanic Pagans (disambiguation)
 Persecution of Ottoman Muslims
 Persecution of Jews
Black Death Jewish persecutions

Persecutions of Christians by other Christians
Anti-Catholicism
Anti-Protestantism
Persecution of Eastern Orthodox Christians
Persecution of Christians in Mexico
Persecution of Christians by Christians

Persecution of Christians by other groups
 Persecution of Christians 
 Persecution of Christians in the New Testament
 Persecution of Christians in the Roman Empire
 Decian persecution
 Persecution in Lyon
  Diocletianic Persecution
 List of Christians martyred during the reign of Diocletian
 Gothic persecution of Christians
 Persecution of Eastern Orthodox Christians
 Persecution of Oriental Orthodox Christians
 Persecution of Copts
 Persecution of Christians in the modern era
 Nazi persecution of the Catholic Church in Germany
 Persecution of Jehovah's Witnesses in Nazi Germany
 Persecution of Christians in the Soviet Union
 Persecution of Christians in the Eastern Bloc
 Eastern Catholic victims of Soviet persecutions
 Religious persecution during the Soviet occupation of Bessarabia and Northern Bukovina
 Anti-Christian violence in India
 Genocide of Christians by ISIL
 Persecution of Christians in the Muslim world

See also
 Persecution of Orthodox Christians (disambiguation)
 Religious persecution